Bonnie, Bonnie Lassie is a lost 1919 American comedy film directed by Tod Browning.

Cast
 Mary MacLaren - Alisa Graeme
 Spottiswoode Aitken - Jeremiah Wishart
 David Butler - David
 Arthur Edmund Carewe - Archibald Loveday (as Arthur Carewe)
 F. A. Turner (as Fred Turner)
 Clarissa Selwynne (as Clarissa Selwyn)
 Eugenie Forde

References

External links

 lantern slide

1919 films
1919 comedy films
1919 lost films
American silent feature films
American black-and-white films
Films directed by Tod Browning
Universal Pictures films
Silent American comedy films
Lost American films
Lost comedy films
1910s American films